Tomášikovo is a village and municipality in Galanta District of  the Trnava Region of south-west Slovakia.

Geography
The municipality lies at an elevation of 118 metres and covers an area of 21.134 km².

Population
On 31 December 2011, it had a population of 1611 people.

History
In the 9th century, the territory of  Tallós became part of the Kingdom of Hungary. In historical records the village was first mentioned in 1646.
After the Austro-Hungarian army disintegrated in November 1918, Czechoslovak troops occupied the area, later acknowledged internationally by the Treaty of Trianon. Between 1938 and 1945 Tallós once more  became part of Miklós Horthy's Hungary through the First Vienna Award. From 1945 until the Velvet Divorce, it was part of Czechoslovakia. Since then it has been part of Slovakia.

References

External links
https://web.archive.org/web/20070513023228/http://www.statistics.sk/mosmis/eng/run.html
http://travel.spectator.sme.sk/articles/1920/ss2009

Villages and municipalities in Galanta District